Samy-Oyame Mawene (born 12 November 1984 in Caen) is a retired professional football midfielder.

Personal life
Mawene was born to a Congolese father and a French nurse. Samy's older brother, Youl, is the current Fleetwood Town fitness coach. His nephew Noah Mawene is also a professional footballer.

References

1984 births
Living people
Footballers from Caen
French sportspeople of Republic of the Congo descent
French footballers
RC Lens players
Stade Malherbe Caen players
Millwall F.C. players
Stafford Rangers F.C. players
Bury F.C. players
Atromitos Yeroskipou players
Paris FC players
Ligue 2 players
Ligue 1 players
English Football League players
National League (English football) players
Cypriot Second Division players
Expatriate footballers in England
Expatriate footballers in Cyprus
Association football midfielders
Black French sportspeople